Giləparqo is a village in the municipality of Miki in the Astara Rayon of Azerbaijan.

References

Populated places in Astara District